Tarella Quin or Quinn (1877–1934), was an Australian children's author and novelist. She was also known as Mrs T. S. Daskein.

Tarella Quin, daughter of Edith Quin (née Dollman) and pastoralist and politician Edward Quin, was born in 1877 on a property near Wilcannia, New South Wales. She was educated in Adelaide at Miss Thornber's school in Unley Park.

Several of her books were illustrated by Ida Rentoul Outhwaite.

Works 

 Gum Tree Brownie and Other Faerie Folk of the Never Never, 1907
 Freckles, 1910
 Before the Lamps are Lit, 1911
 A Desert Rose, 1912
 Kerno: A Stone, 1914
 Paying Guests, 1917
 The Other Side of Nowhere, 1934
 Chimney Town, 1934

References

Further reading 

 

1877 births
1934 deaths
Australian children's writers